Simple Science is an EP by American rock band The Get Up Kids. The first official release from the band since re-forming after breaking up in 2005, and the first studio recording since 2004's Guilt Show, the EP was released April 13, 2010 on vinyl and April 27, 2010 on compact disc (both through the groups newly formed Flyover Records).

Release
The vinyl edition of the release was limited to 2,000 hand-numbered copies, released in four different varieties of 500 pressings each: 180 gram black vinyl, green marble vinyl, pink marble vinyl (exclusive to Hot Topic) and baby blue vinyl (exclusive to Vinyl Collective).

The compact disc version was released on April 27, 2010 and limited to 10,000 hand-numbered copies. The digital download version of the album will be available exclusively through iTunes.

Track listing

Personnel
Band
Matt Pryor - Lead Vocals, Guitar
Jim Suptic - Guitar, Vocals
Rob Pope - Bass
Ryan Pope - Drums
James Dewees - Keyboards, Vocals

Production
Ed Rose - Production

Chart performance

Notes

The Get Up Kids EPs
2010 EPs